Joseph Bruno (1929–2020) was an American businessman and Republican politician in New York.

Joseph Bruno may also refer to:
 Joseph James Bruno (c. 1878–1951), mastermind of the Kelayres massacre, prison escapee
 Joseph F. Bruno (born 1944), public official in New York City
 Joseph Jon Bruno (1946–2021), Episcopal bishop of Los Angeles
 Joseph W. Bruno (born 1955), American academic and president of Marietta College
 Joseph Bruno (Maine politician) (born 1955), American politician from Maine
 Joe Bruno (rugby league) (born 1985), Papua New Guinea rugby league international